Einar Fredrik Bernhard von Strokirch (22 April 1879, Styrshult, Skaraborg County - 9 November 1932, Hjo) was a Swedish painter, graphic artist, illustrator and writer.

Life and work
He was the son of Christoffer von Strokirch, a landowner, and his wife, Baroness Gustava Charlotta Ingeborg Carolina Fleetwood. He was also engaged in a substantial amount of self-study; involving trips to Denmark, Holland, France, Belgium and England.

His first major exhibition was in 1903, at a show devoted to Swedish art in Helsingborg. He married Gabriella Bohman in 1919. From 1921 to 1924, he was an artistic advisor at the Swedish Theatre, and assisted in the production of several historical plays. His works include historical scenes, portraits, landscapes and animals, but he is best known for his depictions of uniformed soldiers, from different times and regiments, thoroughly researched to ensure their accuracy.

His book illustrations were numerous, including those for Karolinerna, by Verner von Heidenstam, En strid om Rom, by Felix Dahn. On his own, he published Svenska arméns munderingar 1680–1905 (Swedish Army Uniforms) and Hur hemmet danas (How a Home is Designed). He also wrote short stories and published two novels under the pseudonym "Ernst Blom".

They are also a prominent feature in some officers' messes.

References

 Svenskt konstnärslexikon, Vol.V, pp. 286–287, Allhems Förlag, Malmö. (Libris)

External links

 More military uniform illustrations from the Armémuseum @ DigitaltMuseum

1879 births
1932 deaths
Swedish painters
Swedish illustrators
Military art
Academy of Fine Arts, Munich alumni
People from Västergötland
Einar